Blue's Big Musical Movie (also known as Blue's Big Musical, Blue's Clues: The Movie and The Blue's Clues Movie) is a 2000 American direct-to-video live-action/animated musical film based on the Blue's Clues television series. It was released on VHS and DVD on October 3, 2000. The movie also aired on television, starting with a primetime premiere on January 13, 2002. A video game based on the film was released for the PlayStation around the same time, making it the only Blue's Clues video game on a home console other than the V.Smile.

Plot
Blue welcomes the viewer to the house where Mr. Salt and Mrs. Pepper are preparing to have a big music show until they hear snoring. Steve is still asleep, so Blue goes into the bedroom and helps Tickety Tock wake him up. When Steve wakes up, he needs help to get everything ready for the "You Can Be Anything You Wanna Be" show. Steve and the rest of his friends go into the kitchen to have breakfast. Periwinkle mishears about a magic show as he watches through the window and  heads off to practice his magic trick. Blue gives Steve a list of things to do. Steve makes up a plan about what Slippery Soap, Shovel and Pail, Mailbox, Tickety and Blue are going to sing about in the big music show. Tickety said Blue would be her duet and sing about being a classroom teacher.

Tickety loses her voice before the show, but she can ring her bells. But this makes Blue sad because she doesn't want to sing all alone. Luckily, she wants to play the game Blue's Clues to find another person to be her singing partner. Steve adds three clues to his list of things to do. Throughout the special, everyone works hard to prepare for the music show while Steve, Sidetable Drawer, and Periwinkle struggle to achieve certain goals. Steve wishes to be able to find a clue without the help of the viewers, Sidetable Drawer struggles to tell Steve her wish to be in the show, and Periwinkle fails to get Steve's attention to watch his magic tricks.

Soon enough, the show is almost ready. Steve has found two of the three clues and has checked off almost everything on the list. With the help of a musical note named G-Cleft (Ray Charles), Steve manages to write his song and just has the last clue to find. After some encouragement from the others, Steve manages to find the last clue without any assistance. He learns that Sidetable Drawer should be Blue's singing partner but is unable to find her because he assigned her to other tasks throughout the special and she has run off despondent. Periwinkle and Sidetable Drawer find each other and, after lamenting about their failed goals, come up with an idea to accomplish both. Periwinkle performs a magic trick that makes Sidetable Drawer reappear in front of everyone and Sidetable Drawer finally gets her wish to participate in the music show.

Periwinkle soon learns the truth about the music show. He hides in shame for his disappointment but still puts his talents to use by being the opening act while everyone else makes final preparations because the audience is starting to get impatient from waiting. Soon, everyone is ready and Periwinkle finishes his act. Everyone performs their acts and the music show is a huge success. Steve thanks the viewers for all their help, everyone sings a Broadway-styled version of the "So Long Song" and everyone takes their final bows to conclude the show.

Cast

 Steven Burns as Steve

Voice cast
 Traci Paige Johnson as Blue
 Nick Balaban as Mr. Salt 
 Spencer Kayden as Mrs. Pepper
 Jenna Marie Castle and Aleisha Allen as Paprika
 Kelly Nigh as Tickety Tock 
 Cody Ross Pitts and Evan Dorfman as Slippery Soap 
 Michael Rubin as Mailbox 
 Olivia Zaro as Pail 
 Jonathan Press as Shovel 
 Cameron Bowen as Periwinkle
 Aleisha Allen as Sidetable Drawer
 Adam Peltzman as Green Puppy 
 Koyalee Chanda as Magenta 
 Alexander Claffy as Purple Kangaroo

Guest stars
 Ray Charles as G-Clef
 Jimmy Hayes, Jerry Lawson, Joe Russell, and Jayotis Washington (The Persuasions) as the Notes

Reception
Hartford Courant wrote that while the film teaches children "sharing and working together", it also teaches "self-expression and friendship" through "the smooth tones of Ray Charles" as the voice of G-Clef, and remarked that it was "an excellent segment".

Digitally Obsessed wrote the film was a "mixture of Pee-wee's Playhouse and Peanuts with a touch of Where's Waldo thrown in that is probably a lot of fun for kids and teaches while requiring the kids to think".

Chicago Sun-Times noted that as being centered in the world of the "most watched pre-school television show", the video will prove popular with parents of young children.

Time stated that direct to video where children's films are concerned and noted that Blue's Big Musical Movie spun the popular children's television series into a "full-length extravaganza".

In Doug Pratt's DVD: Movies, Television, Music, Art, Adult, and More!, author Pratt observes that even though designed for toddlers, Steven Burns, as the only human in the cast, delivered a "remarkable and consistent performance" while speaking directly to the camera in addressing his young viewers, speaking slowly and clearly without being condescending or patronizing.

Review Corner wrote that the film was "complete with all the charm and learning that makes the television series outstanding, and then some".  They offered that while the "feature-film debut follows basically the same tried-and-true format of the television series, it contains longer (mostly musical) interludes and plenty of mini-stories and adventures along the way", as well as introducing a new character, Periwinkle the cat.

Awards and nominations
The film earned a Young Artist Award nomination for Best Family Feature Film, but lost to the 2001 DreamWorks animated film Shrek.
 2001, Nominated for Young Artist Award for Best Family Feature Film – Animation

Songs/Musical numbers (soundtrack version)
 "Today's the Day"
 "At the Show"
 "The Breakfast Song"
 "Clipboard Shuffle"
 "Sidetable's Lament"
 "Blue's Clues Theme Song"
 "Silly Hat"
 "Putting It All Together"
 "Notes"
 "Rhythm"
 "Tempo"
 "Dynamics"
 "There It Is"
 "As Smart as You"
 "Sing"
 "The Magic of Theater"
 "I Can Be Anything That I Want to Be"
 "So Long Song"

References

External links
 Blue's Big Musical Movie at the Internet Movie Database

2000 animated films
2000 direct-to-video films
2000 films
American musical comedy films
2000s musical comedy films
American direct-to-video films
American films with live action and animation
American flash animated films
Nickelodeon animated films
Paramount Pictures animated films
Paramount Pictures direct-to-video films
Films shot in British Columbia
Films shot in California
Films shot in New York (state)
Films shot in Florida
Direct-to-video animated films
2000s American animated films
2000 comedy films
2000s children's animated films
2000s English-language films